List of complete works by Canadian fantasy fiction author Steven Erikson.

Malazan Book of the Fallen

Erikson and Ian C. Esslemont initially devised the Malazan world as a backdrop for a table-top role-playing game. Unhappy with the lack of quality adult oriented fantasy movies at the time, the duo decided to write their own movie script using their gaming experience and the world they had created. The script, titled Gardens of the Moon, was deemed too risky and failed to sell. With interest in the script seeming nonexistent, Erikson, with Esslemont's go ahead, reworked it into a fantasy novel, which he completed around 1991–92.

After meeting almost a decade of rejection, the novel was finally sold to Transworld, a division of Random House. The publisher was pleased with the work and requested additional books in the series. Using the history of the Malazan world, nine additional novels were plotted. After the publication of Gardens of the Moon, reviews spread via the internet, and Orion publications attempted to lure the writer away from Transworld. However, Transworld retained an option on additional novels in the series and offered £675,000 for the remaining nine books of the series.

While there are many plotlines woven through the whole series, the main storyline focuses on a period in time where the Malazan Empire is facing resistance to their conquest of the world. The series was completed with the publication of The Crippled God, the tenth novel in the series, in 2011.

Erikson's background as an archeologist and anthropologist also shaped how he crafted the story. His approach was to use as many perspectives and point of views as possible in terms of interpreting history. He also drew inspiration from Homer'''s Illiad, where gods constantly meddled into mortal affairs, adding the twist that it doesn't always work out as planned for the god.

As of 2018, 3 million copies have been sold.

The Kharkanas Trilogy

After the publication of the seventh novel in the Malazan Book of the Fallen series, Reapers Gale, the publisher agreed to two trilogies and novellas set in the Malazan world. This consequently led to a prequel trilogy, titled the Kharkanas Trilogy, set almost three hundred thousand years before the events of the main series, elements of which he began introducing in Toll the Hounds and in The Crippled God.

The series deals with numerous founding or elder races from the Malazan World, with the narrative anchored around the circumstances that would ultimately lead to the split of the Tiste race. It sheds light and demystifies the events that are often hinted at in the background of Malazan Book of the Fallen. Primarily focusing on characters such as Anomander Rake, Draconus, Gothos, K’rul and Hood, mainly through the eyes of secondary characters.

As of 2022, two novels have been published, Forge of Darkness (2012) and Fall of Light (2016), with the third taking a backseat to the first novel in the Witness trilogy. In a post on his official Facebook account, the author explained that the dismal sale figures for the previous novels and the creative toll employing the writing style used throughout the previous books was what had led to his decision to take a break from it in order to do it justice.

The Witness Trilogy
The second planned trilogy centers around the popular character, Karsa Orlong. This trilogy will be a sequel to the main series, set, according to the author, a decade after the main narrative.

The first novel is titled The God is Not Willing, which was released in November 2021.

The Tales of Bauchelain and Korbal Broach
Erikson wrote side stories centering on two necromancers and their manservant, characters he introduced in Memories of Ice, the third novel in the Malazan Book of the Fallen series. These side stories take place in the Malazan world, but have no connection to the series' overall plot.

As of 2022, seven novellas have been published, the first in 2002, titled Blood Follows, and the latest in 2021, titled Upon a Dark of Evil Overlords. In 2009, the first three novellas were collected and published together as The Tales of Bauchelain and Korbal Broach. And in 2018, books four to six were collected and published together as The Second Collected Tales of Bauchelain & Korbal Broach.

As per his agreement with his publisher, the author is expected to write two more novellas featuring these characters.

Willful Child Trilogy
Erikson is a huge fan of the Star Trek series, especially the first iteration which he credits as being his gateway to science fiction in general. But he finds himself feeling disenfranchised by some of the later iterations, especially from The Next Generation onward. In an interview he goes into detail regarding this issue, concluding that among other things creative compromises were to blame for the dip in quality. But while criticizing the series' current state, he affirms that he nonetheless still is a fan.Willful Child, published in September, 2014, is the writer's "response" to the overused tropes and caricature of Captain Kirk esque characters in science fiction, with the main character, Captain Hardrian, being the most recognizable reflection. While the novel is a spoof of science fiction in general, it is rife with oftentimes poignant social commentary.The Wrath of Betty, the follow-up, was published in 2016.

Rejoice, A Knife to the Heart

Having written a three million words spanning fantasy series and having dealt with all the tropes that came with it, Erikson feels desensitized by most works found in the genre, which is why he prefers reading Science Fiction. For more than a decade, he has also had aspirations to write a First Contact science fiction novel. In 2017, UK based publisher Gollancz revealed in a press release that they had acquired the right to this project, titled Rejoice, A Knife to the Heart''. In Canada, the publishing rights are owned by Promontory Press Inc.

Similar to his fantasy work, the writer revealed that he would be playing with and overturning the conventions and dismantling a few tropes. It was his opinion that far too often the invading aliens would seek contact with an authority figure, someone in power. His goal was to flip that by asking what would happen if the aliens made contact with someone completely opposite.

The novel was released on October 16, 2018, and was received with critical acclaim, with science fiction author Robert Sawyer praising its concept and its execution.

Bibliography

References

Bibliographies by writer
Bibliographies of American writers
Fantasy bibliographies